Tapeh Yahya is an archaeological site in Kermān Province, Iran, some  south of Kerman city,  south of Baft city and 90 km south-west of Jiroft.

History

Habitation spans the 6th to 2nd millennia BCE and the 10th to 4th centuries BCE.

In the 3rd millennium BCE, the city was a production center of chlorite stone ware; these carved dark stone vessels have been found in ancient Mesopotamian temples.

"Elaborate stone vessels carved with repeating designs, both geometric and naturalistic, in an easily recognizable “intercultural style”, were made primarily of chlorite; a number were produced at the important site of Tepe Yahya (Yaḥyā) southeast of Kermān in the middle and late 3rd millennium b.c.e. Some of these vessels were painted natural color (dark green) and inlaid with pastes and shell, and some have even been found with cuneiform inscriptions referring to rulers and known Sumerian deities. More than 500 vessels and vessel fragments carved in this style have been recovered from sites ranging from Uzbekistan and the Indus Valley (e.g., Mohenjo-daro) in the east to Susa and all the major Sumerian sites in Mesopotamia, including Mari, in the west and to the Persian Gulf, particularly Tarut and the Failaka Islands, in the south."

Steatite was also very common at this site. Nearby, a steatite mine has been discovered. Over a thousand steatite pieces belonging to Period IVB were found, indicating local manufacturing.

The distribution of these vessels was very wide. They were found not only in Mesopotamia, but also in Bampur IV, and in Shahr-i Sokhta. They were also found in the lower levels at Mohenjodaro. Steatite bowls with similar motifs are also found on Tarut island, and copies have been found at Umm-an Nar in the Persian Gulf.

The period of Proto-Elamite influence lasted from about 3400 to 2500 BC.

Archaeology

The site is a circular mound,  around 20 meters in height
and around 187 meters in diameter.

It was excavated in six seasons from 1967 to 1975 by the American School of Prehistoric Research of the Peabody Museum of Archaeology and Ethnology of Harvard University in a joint operation with what is now the Shiraz University. The expedition
was under the direction of C. C. Lamberg-Karlovsky.

 Jane Britton was one of the excavators on the dig in 1968.

Periodization is as follows:

Period I Sasanian pre: 200 BC-400 A.D.
Period II Achaemenian(?): 275-500 B.C.
Period III Iron Age: 500-1000 B.C.
Period IV A Elamite?: 2200-2500 B.C.
IV B Proto-Elamite: 2500-3000 B.C.
IV C Proto-Elamite: 3000-3400 B.C.
Period V Yahya Culture: 3400-3800 B.C.
Period VI Coarse Ware-Neolithic: 3800-4500 B.C.
Period VII: 4500-5500 B.C.

Period VI in Yahya (4500-3800 BC, or perhaps 5000-4700 BC) is contemporary with the early Bakun culture in Fars Province.

Metallurgy
In Period IVB (3100-2700 B.C.), a copper-bronze dagger was found which contained 3.0% tin, seemingly representing an alloy of tin. This is a very early evidence for copper-tin alloying in southwestern Asia.

A related site is Tal-i Iblis, where early metallurgy has also been attested.

Early writing
To Period IVC belong six proto-Elamite tablets that have been recovered. Also, eighty-four tablet blanks indicate that writing was being practised at Yahya. These finds are similar to the discoveries at Susa Cb and Sialk IV.

Also, an object was found similar to a writing stylus.

Konar Sandal
Konar Sandal is located 55 miles north of Yahya and is culturally similar. Both cities traded with Mesopotamia. According to archaeologist Massimo Vidale, Indus civilization weights, seals, and etched carnelian beads were found in the area, demonstrating the connections between these two cultures.

See also
Shahr-i Sokhta
Jiroft culture
Marhasi
Cities of the Ancient Near East

Notes

References
Clifford C. Lamberg-Karlovsky: Excavations at Tepe Yahya, Iran, 1967–1975, The early periods, Cambridge, Massachusetts 1986, 
Clifford C. Lamberg-Karlovsky: Excavations at Tepe Yahya, Iran, 1967–1975, The third millennium, Cambridge, Massachusetts 2001  (Available online at )
 Mutin, Benjamin, The Proto-Elamite Settlement and its Neighbors: Tepe Yahya Period IVC, ed. C.C. Lamberg-Karlovsky, Oxbow Books / American School of Prehistoric Research Publications, 2013 
Peter Magee: Excavations at Tepe Yahya, Iran, 1967-1975: The Iron Age Settlement, 
Peter Damerow, Robert K. Englund: The proto-elamite texts from Tepe Yahya, Cambridge, Massachusetts 1989 
D. T. Potts, The Archaeology of Elam: Formation and Transformation of an Ancient Iranian State, Cambridge University Press, 1999, 
M. L., Eda Vidali and C. C. Lamberg-Karlovsky, Prehistoric Settlement Patterns around Tepe Yahya: A Quantitative Analysis, Journal of Near Eastern Studies, vol. 35, no. 4, pp. 237–250, 1976

External links
Art of the Bronze Age: Southeastern Iran, Western Central Asia, and the Indus Valley, an exhibition catalog from The Metropolitan Museum of Art (fully available online as PDF), which contains material on Tepe Yahya

Tells (archaeology)
Archaeological sites in Iran
Former populated places in Iran
Buildings and structures in Kerman Province
Elam
Jiroft culture